This article lists the prime ministers of Syria since 1920.

List of officeholders

Syria (1920–1958)

United Arab Republic (1958–1961)

Syria (1961–present)

See also
President of Syria
List of presidents of Syria
Vice President of Syria
Prime Minister of Syria
Speaker of the People's Assembly of Syria

References
General

Bibliography

 

Prime Ministers
Syria